In mathematics, the Sierpiński space (or the connected two-point set) is a finite topological space with two points, only one of which is closed.
It is the smallest example of a topological space which is neither trivial nor discrete. It is named after Wacław Sierpiński.

The Sierpiński space has important relations to the theory of computation and semantics, because it is the classifying space for open sets in the Scott topology.

Definition and fundamental properties

The closed sets are

So the singleton set  is closed and the set  is open ( is the empty set).

The closure operator on S is determined by

A finite topological space is also uniquely determined by its specialization preorder. For  the Sierpiński space this preorder is actually a partial order and given by

Topological properties

The Sierpiński space  is a special case of both the finite particular point topology (with particular point 1) and the finite excluded point topology (with excluded point 0). Therefore,  has many properties in common with one or both of these families.

Separation

The points 0 and 1 are topologically distinguishable in S since  is an open set which contains only one of these points. Therefore, S is a Kolmogorov (T0) space.
However, S is not T1 since the point 1 is not closed. It follows that S is not Hausdorff, or Tn for any 
S is not regular (or completely regular) since the point 1 and the disjoint closed set  cannot be separated by neighborhoods. (Also regularity in the presence of T0 would imply Hausdorff.)
S is vacuously normal and completely normal since there are no nonempty separated sets.
S is not perfectly normal since the disjoint closed sets  and  cannot be precisely separated by a function. Indeed,  cannot be the zero set of any continuous function  since every such function is constant.

Connectedness

The Sierpiński space S is both hyperconnected (since every nonempty open set contains 1) and ultraconnected (since every nonempty closed set contains 0).
It follows that S is both connected and path connected. 
Like all finite topological spaces, S is locally path connected.
The Sierpiński space is contractible, so the fundamental group of S is trivial (as are all the higher homotopy groups).

Compactness

Like all finite topological spaces, the Sierpiński space is both compact and second-countable.
The compact subset  of S is not closed showing that compact subsets of T0 spaces need not be closed.
Every open cover of S must contain S itself since S is the only open neighborhood of 0. Therefore, every open cover of S has an open subcover consisting of a single set: 
It follows that S is fully normal.

Convergence

Every sequence in S converges to the point 0. This is because the only neighborhood of 0 is S itself.
A sequence in S converges to 1 if and only if the sequence contains only finitely many terms equal to 0 (i.e. the sequence is eventually just 1's).
The point 1 is a cluster point of a sequence in S if and only if the sequence contains infinitely many 1's.
Examples:
1 is not a cluster point of 
1 is a cluster point (but not a limit) of 
The sequence  converges to both 0 and 1.

Metrizability

The Sierpiński space S is not metrizable or even pseudometrizable since every pseudometric space is completely regular but the Sierpiński space is not even regular.
 S is generated by the hemimetric (or pseudo-quasimetric)  and

Other properties

There are only three continuous maps from S to itself: the identity map and the constant maps to 0 and 1.
It follows that the homeomorphism group of S is trivial.

Continuous functions to the Sierpiński space

Let X be an arbitrary set. The set of all functions from X to the set  is typically denoted  These functions are precisely the characteristic functions of X. Each such function is of the form

Now suppose X is a topological space and let  have the Sierpiński topology. Then a function  is continuous if and only if  is open in X. But, by definition

So  is continuous if and only if U is open in X. Let  denote the set of all continuous maps from X to S and let  denote the topology of X (that is, the family of all open sets).

That is, if we identify  with  the subset of continuous maps is precisely the topology of  

A particularly notable example of this is the Scott topology for partially ordered sets, in which the Sierpiński space becomes the classifying space for open sets when the characteristic function preserves directed joins.

Categorical description

The above construction can be described nicely using the language of category theory. There is a contravariant functor  from the category of topological spaces to the category of sets which assigns each topological space  its set of open sets  and each continuous function  the preimage map

The statement then becomes: the functor  is represented by  where  is the Sierpiński space. That is,  is naturally isomorphic to the Hom functor  with the natural isomorphism determined by the universal element   This is generalized by the notion of a presheaf.

The initial topology

Any topological space X has the initial topology induced by the family  of continuous functions to Sierpiński space. Indeed, in order to coarsen the topology on X one must remove open sets. But removing the open set U would render  discontinuous.

The family of functions  separates points in X if and only if X is a T0 space. Two points  and  will be separated by the function  if and only if the open set U contains precisely one of the two points.

Therefore, if X is T0, we can embed X as a subspace of a product of Sierpiński spaces, where there is one copy of S for each open set U in X. The embedding map

is given by

Since subspaces and products of T0 spaces are T0, it follows that a topological space is T0 if and only if it is homeomorphic to a subspace of a power of S.

In algebraic geometry

The generic point of  coming from the zero ideal, corresponds to the open point 1, while the special point of  coming from the unique maximal ideal, corresponds to the closed point 0.

See also

Notes

References

 
 Michael Tiefenback (1977) "Topological Genealogy", Mathematics Magazine 50(3): 158–60 

General topology
Topological spaces